The  is a Japanese railway line in Mie Prefecture, between Kawarada Station, Yokkaichi and Tsu Station, Tsu. This is the only railway line  operates. The third sector company took the former Japanese National Railways line in 1987. The line was originally built as a shorter route between Nagoya and south Kii Peninsula (Kisei Main Line). As such, the Central Japan Railway Company (JR Central) limited express train "Nanki" and the rapid train "Mie" still use the line, providing the primary revenue stream for the company. The line also transports spectators when Formula One World Championship Japanese Grand Prix is held at Suzuka Circuit (1987-2006, 2009 onward).

Basic data
Distance: 
Gauge: 
Stations: 10
Track: Double between Kawarada - Nakaseko
Electric supply: None
Railway signalling: Automatic
Maximum speed at service:
Limited express, rapid, Out of Service and Extra: 100 km/h - 110 km/h (62 - 68 mph)
Local: 100 km/h (62 mph)

History
The line was opened by JNR in 1973 as a shortcut between the Kansai Main Line and the Kisei Line. The entire line was built with future double-tracking and electrification in mind, as such there is necessary equipment installed along the entire line. However, usage was sluggish and the line operated with a deficit due to the initial single track limiting the number of services to 7 round trips for local plus 3 round trips for Limited Express Services daily. On the other hand, the Kintetsu Nagoya Line which ran parallel to the Ise line operated with 44 round trips Limited Express, 34 round trips Express, 9 round trips Semi-express, and 62 round trips local services daily.

After the dissolution of JNR, the Ise Line was scheduled to be abolished, and since the line ran outside urban areas there was no opposition from the local residents or government. In 1986, it was decided to convert the line over to a third sector railway. In 1987 the line was transferred to the Ise Railway Co. At the time of conversion, the only train exchange facility was at Tamagaki Station therefore it was decided that the section between Kawarada and Nakaseko was to be double-tracked to increase transport capacity. In 1993, the track between Kawarada and Nakaseko was doubled which increased the transport capacity to 55 round trips per day. The cost of construction for double-tracking between Kawarada-Nakaseko (12.7 km) was 2.05 billion yen, of which Ise Railways paid 430 million yen while the rest was paid by the national government, Mie Prefecture, and the local government along the line. Most passengers are those that pass through on the "Mie" Rapid and "Nanki" Limited Express services, but there are increasing commuter passengers due to the opening of the Suzuka University near Nakaseko Station. In 1996, the line turned a profit for the first time.

Freight services started operations in 2008, but ceased in 2013.

Stations
All stations are in Mie Prefecture.

Key:
L: 
R: 
E: 
Smaller keys show that some trains stop on the days of racing events at Suzuka Circuit.

See also
List of railway companies in Japan
List of railway lines in Japan

References
This article incorporates material from the corresponding article in the Japanese Wikipedia

External links 
  

Railway lines in Japan
Rail transport in Mie Prefecture
1067 mm gauge railways in Japan
Japanese third-sector railway lines